Těmice is a municipality and village in Hodonín District in the South Moravian Region of the Czech Republic. It has about 900 inhabitants.

Notable people
Josef Kolmaš (1933–2021), sinologist and tibetologist

References

Villages in Hodonín District
Moravian Slovakia